Orby Lee Cantrell (November 10, 1906 – April 29, 1982) was an American Democratic Party politician who served as a member of the Virginia House of Delegates from 1952 to his death in 1982. At the time of his passing, he was the longest-tenured member of the Virginia General Assembly.

Education: 

 Pound High School Radford College

Memberships/Affiliations: 
Masons Lions Wise County Chamber of Commerce (former president) Peoples Bank of Pound (executive vice president, former president) Breaks Interstate Park Association Clinch Valley College Advisory Committee (former president) Kentucky Colonels St. Mary's Hospital Advisory Committee Appalachian Regional Hospital Advisory Committee (former member)

References

External links 
 
 

1906 births
1982 deaths
Democratic Party members of the Virginia House of Delegates
Radford University alumni
20th-century American politicians
People from Pound, Virginia